The Prophecy: Uprising is a 2005 fantasy-action-horror-thriller film and the fourth installment in The Prophecy series. This chapter does not feature series regular Christopher Walken, instead starring Doug Bradley, British actor Sean Pertwee, and frequent horror film actress Kari Wuhrer in the lead roles.

This installment continues with the tale of war between angels. In the first war between the angels, Lucifer was cast out of heaven and became the creator of hell. Soon another war between angels started. This time there are two camps: one faction that hates humans and wants them to fall from God's grace, and a second group that helps humans.

Plot
In Romania, theology student Allison has come into possession of The Lexicon, a mysterious book of prophecies that writes itself. This book contains a 23rd chapter of the Book of Revelation, which is still not complete. The last chapter depicts the end of the war of angels and the name of the Antichrist. One of the angels who fell with Satan, Belial (now a demon), wants this book.  Simon, a good angel, opposes him and guides Allison by taking advantage of her mental illness to speak directly to her. While searching for Allison and the book, and to avoid detection, Belial murders people and takes their form.

Satan, pretending to be Interpol agent John Riegert, seeks the help of Dani Simionescu, a police officer who, as a child, provided information to the Romanian secret police about his parents. His parents and baby sister were brought to one of the secret police headquarters and tortured. His baby sister got hurt and was given up for adoption. Satan, as Riegert, reveals that she is Allison. During the investigation, Riegert uses Dani to help track Belial and locate his sister. After the police arrest Belial's current host, Belial possesses one of Dani's coworkers, Laurel.

After revealing himself, Satan brings Dani to the house that was the site of the inhumane tortures. Allison, with guidance of the voices in her head, reaches the same place, followed by Belial, as Laurel. It is the only place where Belial cannot hurt Allison. It is a place of evil, which makes it Satan's domain, and he offers Allison his protection.  Satan explains that, for his own motives, he is willing to assist humanity, as he does not wish Belial to succeed, though he is unable or unwilling to take direct action.

Dani confesses  his sins and seeks forgiveness but is rebuked by his sister. It is here that real motives are revealed. Belial, who was once loyal to Satan, has grown tired of the war between angels and its blurring of morality. Even Satan has taken more of shade of gray, and Belial wants to return to the black and white morality of earlier times. Satan opposes him because he wants to prolong the fighting and prevent a new Hell from emerging. Dani, realizing that Belial needs a host, shoots Laurel, but, before he can kill himself, he is possessed.  Allison kills her brother, and Satan absorbs Belial's soul. After Allison forgives her brother, she leaves the house.

At dawn, Satan tells Allison that, for the present, the war of angels is over, but it will not be for long. Showing her glimpses of her future, he advises her to keep the book safe.

Cast
 John Light as John Riegert / Satan
 Sean Pertwee as Dani Simionescu
 Kari Wuhrer as Allison
 Jason London as Simon
 Doug Bradley as Laurel
 Georgina Rylance as Calra
 Stephen Billington as Ion
 Dan Chiriac as Serban
 Boris Petroff as Father Constantin
 Alin Cristea as Cantor

Development
The Prophecy: Uprising and The Prophecy: Forsaken were filmed simultaneously in Bucharest, Romania. Furthermore, these films are the first to not have Christopher Walken and Steve Hytner reprise their roles as the Archangel Gabriel and the coroner Joseph, respectively.

Reception
Witney Seibold of CraveOnline called it convoluted and "a little hard to follow".  Marco Lanzagorta of PopMatters wrote, "Still, and in spite of a convoluted plot, The Prophecy: Uprising is not an entirely bad film." Beyond Hollywood wrote, "Uprising isn't really a bad movie, although if judged as a standalone film, it's very short and incomplete." Scott Weinberg of DVD Talk rated it 1.5/5 stars and called it "a picture-perfect example of squeezing a cinematic stone for its last droplet of blood".

See also

 List of films about angels

References

External links
 
 

2005 films
2005 horror films
American fantasy films
Direct-to-video horror films
2000s English-language films
Romanian-language films
The Prophecy (film series)
Direct-to-video sequel films
Films shot in Bucharest
The Devil in film
Films directed by Joel Soisson
Films with screenplays by Joel Soisson
Dimension Films films
American supernatural horror films
2005 directorial debut films
2000s American films